Win with the Stars is an American game show that ran in syndication from 1968–1969. The host was Allen Ludden, and the series was sponsored by local supermarkets.

Gameplay
Two celebrity/contestant teams competed. Each team had 45 seconds to guess as many songs as they could, with an attempt to sing the first lines of those songs after each guess. Guessing the song title earned five points, with another point awarded per correct word in the first lines; if an incorrect word was sung, a horn (later used on The Hollywood Squares) was played and the team immediately stopped.

Three games were played in each episode in a tournament format, and the winner of the third game had his/her winnings doubled.

Production
The show was a revival of a show originally produced for NBC in the daytime during the 1964-65 TV season titled What's This Song?, hosted by Wink Martindale.

References

External links
 Win with the Stars on IMDb

Musical game shows
1960s American game shows
1968 American television series debuts
1969 American television series endings
English-language television shows
First-run syndicated television programs in the United States